The 2015 World's Strongest Man was the 38th edition of the World's Strongest Man competition. It took place in Putrajaya, Malaysia from April 19 to 26. The competition was won by Brian Shaw of the United States for the third time, with defending champion Žydrūnas Savickas of Lithuania second and Hafþór Júlíus Björnsson of Iceland third.

Heat Results
Each qualifying heat consisted of six competitors and six events. Unlike previous years, the final heats event, the Atlas Stones, was worth double points. After the six events, the top two competitors from each heat will qualify for the final.

Heat 1

Heat 2

Heat 3

Heat 4

Heat 5

Finals Events Results

Event 1: Super Yoke
Weight: 
Course Length: 
Time Limit: 60 seconds

Event 2: Deadlift
Weight:  for repetitions
Time Limit: 60 seconds

Event 3: Truck Pull
Weight: 
Course Length: 
Time Limit: 60 seconds
 None of the athletes completed the full course

Event 4: Power Stairs
Weight: Three weights at  each
Time Limit: 60 seconds
 Each weight must be carried up 5 steps

Event 5: Max Log Press
Opening Weight:

Event 6: Atlas Stones
Weight: 5 stones ranging from 
Time Limit: 60 seconds

Final standings

References

External links

2015 in Malaysia
Events in Putrajaya
World's Strongest Man